Soul Searching Sun is the third album released by Life of Agony in 1997 through Roadrunner Records. The album was co-produced and co-mixed by Life of Agony and Phil Nicolo of the Butcher Brothers at Studio 4 Recording in Conshohocken, Pennsylvania. This was the band's only recording with new drummer Dan Richardson and featured what was another stylistic change for the band, incorporating psychedelic elements into their sound and featured their first true ballad in "My Mind Is Dangerous". 

Upon release in North America, the album was issued with three hidden tracks: "River Runs Red" (Re-Zamped) which was a re-recording of one of the band's most enduring songs from their debut album of the same name, "Let's Pretend (Trippin')" which was a psychedelic styled remake of a song off of their second album Ugly, and "Weeds (Unplugged)" which was an alternate, acoustic version of the album's first single. These bonus tracks were not listed on the packaging or in the album's liner notes. Shortly after the initial release of the album, Roadrunner Records released a digipak reissue of the album in Europe, which included the first two bonus tracks from the North American limited edition along with "Tangerine (Re-Zep)", a Led Zeppelin cover song, which featured, fellow NYC band, Anthrax's Charile Benante on 6-string acoustic guitar and 12-string acoustic guitar. All four of these bonus tracks were recorded separately from the proper album, in June of 1997 at Andy Kravitz's "The Amazing Barn" in Conshohocken, with Kravitz co-producing and co-mixing. A fifth track, another re-recording entitled "How It Would Be '97", was also recorded at these sessions and was released as a b-side on the "Weeds" slimline CD single. Shortly after the album's release, lead singer Mina Caputo would leave the band to launch a solo career, citing her heart no longer being into the music. Life Of Agony recruited former Ugly Kid Joe singer Whitfield Crane to step in to fulfill touring obligations in support of "Soul Searching Sun". However the band disbanded shortly thereafter. Life Of Agony's original lineup would reunite for the first time in 2003 to perform two sold out shows at NYC's Irving Plaza. Several tracks from "Soul Searching Sun" including "My Mind Is Dangerous" were performed at these shows.

Track listing

Personnel
Life of Agony
Mina Caputo - lead vocals
Dan Richardson - drums
Alan Robert - bass
Joey Z. - guitar
Additional musicians
Charlie Benante - 6 and 12 string acoustic guitar 
Philip Nowlan - piano (on "My Mind is Dangerous")
Technical personnel
Phil Nicolo - recording
Phil Nicolo and Life Of Agony - production and mixing 
Andy Kravitz - additional production
Dirk Grobelny, Ian Cross, Philip Nowlan, Andy Kravitz - engineers
Mike "Bones" Malak, Brian Lloyd - assistant engineers
Brian James, Chris Gately, Jeremy Birnbaum - technical support
George Marino - mastering
Dave McKean - art illustrations and design
Kristen Callahan - band Photography

References 

Life of Agony albums
1997 albums
Roadrunner Records albums
Albums with cover art by Dave McKean